The Midwest Sociological Society (MSS) is a "… membership organization of academic and applied sociologists as well as students of the discipline." The society was founded in 1936 and held its first annual meeting in 1937. In 2011–12 its membership marked its 75th anniversary at annual meetings held in St Louis and Minneapolis.

While membership of the society is open to everyone, the majority of its 1300 members (2/3) are from the Midwest.

The society publishes the scholarly journal, The Sociological Quarterly; holds an annual meeting each spring; supports fellowship, grant, and award programs; and supports research by its members.

Presidents

Notes

References

Further reading

Sociological organizations
1936 establishments in the United States